Pycnonotus is a genus of frugivorous passerine birds in the bulbul family Pycnonotidae.

Taxonomy and systematics
The genus Pycnonotus was introduced by the German zoologist Friedrich Boie in 1826 with the Cape bulbul as the type species. The name of the genus combines the Ancient Greek words puknos "thick" or "compact" and -nōtos "-backed".

The genus contains the following 32 species:

 Cream-vented bulbul (Pycnonotus simplex)
 Olive-winged bulbul (Pycnonotus plumosus)
 Asian red-eyed bulbul (Pycnonotus brunneus)
 Straw-headed bulbul (Pycnonotus zeylanicus)
 Cream-eyed bulbul (Pycnonotus pseudosimplex)
 Ashy-fronted bulbul (Pycnonotus cinereifrons)
 White-browed bulbul (Pycnonotus luteolus)
 Ayeyarwady bulbul (Pycnonotus blanfordi)
 Streak-eared bulbul (Pycnonotus conradi)
 Stripe-throated bulbul (Pycnonotus finlaysoni)
 Flavescent bulbul (Pycnonotus flavescens)
 Aceh bulbul (Pycnonotus snouckaerti)
 Orange-spotted bulbul (Pycnonotus bimaculatus)
 Pale-faced bulbul (Pycnonotus leucops)
 Yellow-throated bulbul (Pycnonotus xantholaemus)
 Yellow-eared bulbul (Pycnonotus penicillatus)
 Brown-breasted bulbul (Pycnonotus xanthorrhous)
 Light-vented bulbul (Pycnonotus sinensis)
 Styan's bulbul (Pycnonotus taivanus)
 Red-whiskered bulbul (Pycnonotus jocosus)
 Yellow-vented bulbul (Pycnonotus goiavier)
 Red-vented bulbul (Pycnonotus cafer)
 Sooty-headed bulbul (Pycnonotus aurigaster)
 White-eared bulbul (Pycnonotus leucotis)
 Himalayan bulbul (Pycnonotus leucogenys)
 White-spectacled bulbul (Pycnonotus xanthopygos)
 African red-eyed bulbul (Pycnonotus nigricans)
 Common bulbul (Pycnonotus barbatus)
 Dodson's bulbul (Pycnonotus dodsoni)
 Somali bulbul (Pycnonotus somaliensis)
 Dark-capped bulbul (Pycnonotus tricolor)
 Cape bulbul (Pycnonotus capensis)

Former species

In previous circumscriptions the genus Pycnonotus was considerably larger. Recent taxonomic revisions have seen many species transferred to other genera.

In 2010, eighteen former Pycnonotus species were reclassified into different genera, either directly from Pycnonotus or from the genus Andropadus, to which they had already been transferred by some authorities. These changes were as follows:
 one species was transferred to genus Stelgidillas.
 Slender-billed greenbul ( former Pycnonotus gracilirostri or Pycnonotus gracilirostris)
 twelve species were transferred to genus Arizelocichla: 
 Shelley's greenbul (former Pycnonotus masukuensis)
 Kakamega greenbul (nominate) (former Pycnonotus kakamegae)
 Cameroon greenbul (former Pycnonotus montanus, as Arizelocichla montana)
 Western greenbul (former Pycnonotus tephrolaemus)
Olive-breasted greenbul (former Pycnonotus tephrolaema)
 Mountain greenbul (former Pycnonotus nigriceps)
 Uluguru greenbul (former Pycnonotus neumanni)
 Black-browed greenbul (former Pycnonotus  fusciceps)
 Yellow-throated greenbul (former Pycnonotus chlorigula)
 Stripe-cheeked greenbul (former Pycnonotus milanjensis)
 Olive-headed greenbul (former Pycnonotus olivaceiceps)
 Stripe-faced greenbul (former Pycnonotus strifacies)
 five species were transferred to genus Eurillas:
 Little greenbul (former Pycnonotus virens)
 Little grey greenbul (former Pycnonotus gracilis)
 Ansorge's greenbul (former Pycnonotus ansorgei)
 Plain greenbul (former Pycnonotus curvirostris)
 Yellow-whiskered greenbul (former Pycnonotus latirostris)

In 2020, a further 17 species were transferred to other genera:

 Black-and-white bulbul (former Pycnonotus melanoleucos, moved to the monotypic genus Microtarsus) 
 Puff-backed bulbul (former Pycnonotus eutilotus, moved to the monotypic genus Eutilotus)
 Yellow-wattled bulbul (former Pycnonotus urostictus, moved to monotypic genus Poliolophus)
 Two species to genus Alcurus:
 Striated bulbul (former Pycnonotus striatus)
 Spot-necked bulbul (former Pycnonotus tympanistrigus)
 Four species to genus Brachypodius: 
 Grey-headed bulbul (former Pycnonotus priocephalus)
 Black-headed bulbul (former Pycnonotus atriceps, as Brachypodius melanocephalos; the species epithet melanocephalos has priority over atriceps)
 Andaman bulbul (former Pycnonotus fuscoflavescens)
 Blue-wattled bulbul (former Pycnonotus nieuwenhuisii)
 Three species to genus Ixodia:
 Spectacled bulbul (former Pycnonotus erythropthalmos)
 Grey-bellied bulbul (former Pycnonotus cyaniventris)
 Scaly-breasted bulbul (former Pycnonotus squamatus)
 Five species to genus  Rubigula: 
 Black-crested bulbul (former Pycnonotus flaviventris)
 Flame-throated bulbul (former Pycnonotus gularis)
 Black-capped bulbul (former Pycnonotus melanicterus)
 Ruby-throated bulbul (former Pycnonotus dispar)
 Bornean bulbul (former Pycnonotus montis)

Other former Pycnonotus species include:

 Sombre greenbul (former Pycnonotus importunus, now Andropadus importunus)
 Yellow-throated leaflove (former Haematornis flavicollis or Pycnonotus flavicollis, now Atimastillas flavicollis)
 Hairy-backed bulbul (former Brachypodius criniger, now Tricholestes criniger)
Bare-faced bulbul (former Pycnonotus hualon, now Nok hualon)
 Cream-striped bulbul (former Pycnonotus leucogrammicus, now Hemixos leucogrammicus)

References

External links
 

 
Bulbuls
Taxonomy articles created by Polbot